The SS James Carruthers was a Canadian Great Lakes freighter built in 1913. The ship was owned by the St. Lawrence & Chicago Steam and Navigation Company of Toronto, Ontario, with the official registry number 131090.

The Carruthers was lost 9 November 1913 on Lake Huron during the Great Lakes Storm of 1913. The crew of 22 perished with the vessel.

Construction 

The James Carruthers was built at Collingwood, Ontario by the Collingwood Shipbuilding Company; her hull number was 00038. She was a steel-hulled, propeller-driven lake freighter; 550 feet in length, 58 feet wide and 27 feet deep. The gross tonnage was 7862 and the net tonnage 5606.

Final voyage 
On the evening of November 6, 1913, the James Carruthers loaded a total of 375,000 bushels of wheat at Fort William, Ontario. Her destination was Midland, Ontario, on the shores of Georgian Bay. Captain William H. Wright had conferred with another downbound skipper, S.A. Lyons of the J.H. Sheadle, and planned to travel down Lake Superior together. Wright commented on his new boat, "We've still to learn all her tricks, and some of the lads in the fo'c'sle are complaining that the paint in their rooms is still a little sticky."

By 3 o'clock on the morning of Saturday, November 8, the first hints of the storm blew over Lake Superior. The winds quickly shifted from southwest to northwest, bringing with them freezing temperatures, snow squalls, and high waves. The Carruthers and the Sheadle were better than halfway to the Soo when the storm hit. By the evening, both vessels were locking through and snaking their way down the St. Mary's River. While going down the river the Canadian freighter passed the upbound Midland Prince. Angus "Ray" McMillan, wheelsman of the Carruthers, sighted his friend Jack Daley aboard the Prince and yelled out, "We're going to Midland this time, Jack! I'll tell your father we passed you!" At 12:53 on the morning of Sunday, November 9, the Carruthers was sighted taking on coal at the Picklands, Mather & Company dock near De Tour, Michigan. Shortly after refueling, the James Carruthers entered Lake Huron, with the J.H. Sheadle a short distance behind. The lights of the Carruthers were visible for a short time aboard the Sheadle as they sailed on a southeastern heading. A little after dawn, the Carruthers turned to port on a course that would keep her south of Great Duck Island and on a straight line for Georgian Bay. The Carruthers hasn't been seen since.

Aftermath 
After the great storm finally blew itself out late on Monday, November 10, copious amounts of wreckage from several boats began to wash onto Lake Huron's shores. Evidence of the James Carruthers was slow at first, until great amounts of debris from Canada's newest and largest freighter began coming ashore, mostly near Kincardine and Point Clark. A large field of wreckage was found offshore between Kincardine and Goderich, nearly seventy miles (113 km) south of the Carruthers'''s known course. Several bodies of the crew washed ashore as well, mostly around Point Clark. Captain Wright was identified by his large red mustache. Most of the bodies wore life jackets and heavy coats, indicating that they had had time to prepare for disaster. During the height of the storm late on the afternoon of the 9th, several witnesses heard steamer whistles and sighted distress rockets far offshore of Inverhuron. It was concluded that the rockets were from the Carruthers as most of her wreckage and crew were found in the vicinity. How the brand-new freighter sank, and how she came to be so far off course (she was bound for Georgian Bay) are mysteries that have never been answered. As of 2021, the wreck of the James Carruthers has not been located.

 John Thompson 
By the evening of Tuesday, November 11, there were still several unidentified bodies in the Goderich morgue from a few different vessels. Thomas Thompson of Hamilton, Ontario, scanned the corpses for signs of his son John, a crewman aboard the James Carruthers. Thomas saw one body who looked a lot like his son. The facial features and hair color were identical. The corpse was missing an eyetooth like his son and had a tattoo of J.T. on the left forearm. Several scars and a birth defect (the second and third toes of the feet grew together) convinced Thomas Thompson that he had finally found his son John. He arranged to take possession of the body and notified his family.

Meanwhile, in Toronto, John Thompson read newspaper accounts of the great storm and saw his name on a list of the known dead. Thompson had not accompanied the Carruthers'' on its final voyage. Instead of immediately wiring his family, young Thompson leisurely took a train to Hamilton to explain what happened in person. While John dawdled, his father Thomas had purchased a coffin, somberly watched as a grave was dug, and made funeral preparations for his dead son. Once in Hamilton, John still inexplicably wandered around town, visiting a friend who advised him to return home at once. Young Thompson walked into his family's house while the wake was in progress. Mrs. Thompson, after the tremendous shock, was overjoyed that her son was still alive. Thomas Thompson was angered beyond belief at the debts incurred and shame, and yelled "It's just like you to come home and attend your own wake, and you can get right out of this house until this thing blows over!" The young man whom Thomas Thompson mistook for his son remains unidentified to this day; he rests with four other unknown sailors in Goderich, Ontario.

References

External links 
University of Detroit Mercy
Historical Collection of the Great Lakes Great Lakes Vessels Online Index
The Big Storm of 1913

Shipwrecks of Lake Huron
Maritime incidents in 1913
1913 ships
Ships built in Collingwood, Ontario
Ships lost with all hands
Missing ships
Great Lakes freighters
Ships powered by a triple expansion steam engine